Kepler-66 is a star with slightly more mass than the Sun in the NGC 6811 open cluster in the Cygnus constellation. It has one confirmed planet, slightly smaller than Neptune, announced in 2013.

Planetary system

References

External links
Kepler-66, The Open Exoplanet Catalogue
Kepler 66, Exoplanet.eu

G-type main-sequence stars
Cygnus (constellation)
1958
Planetary transit variables
Planetary systems with one confirmed planet